Elections to Rossendale Borough Council were held on 4 May 2006.  One third of the council was up for election and the Conservative party stayed in overall control of the council.

After the election, the composition of the council was
Conservative 25
Labour 9
Liberal Democrat 1
Independent 1

Election result

Ward results

References
2006 Rossendale election result
Ward results

2006
2006 English local elections
2000s in Lancashire